Allen Skillicorn was a Republican member of the Illinois House of Representatives who represented the 66th district from 2017 to 2021. The 66th State House District includes parts of Algonquin, Crystal Lake, East and West Dundee, Elgin, Gilberts, Huntley, Lake in the Hills, Lakewood and Sleepy Hollow.

Early life and education 
Born in the 1970s, Skillicorn was raised in Algonquin, Illinois. He graduated from Dundee-Crown High School and received an associate degree from Elgin Community College.

Career
Skillicorn worked as a Director of Marketing for a local electronics manufacturer.

Skillicorn served as a trustee for East Dundee, Illinois and as vice-chairman of the Kane County Republican Party. He also served as Chairman of the Republican Liberty Caucus of Illinois, Liberty Leader for the Illinois Policy Institute, Illinois Rifle Association, former board member of the Northern Kane County Chamber of Commerce, Sports Car Club of America, and a volunteer for Therapy Dogs, Inc.

Illinois House of Representatives
After incumbent Republican Michael W. Tryon announced he would retire at the end of his term, four Republican candidates contested to replace him in the 2016 election, although one of those candidates withdrew and endorsed Skillicorn. Skillicorn won the primary with 37.1% of the vote. He won the general election on November 8, 2016, with 57.6% of the vote. Skillicorn was sworn in on January 11, 2017.

In 2018, Skillicorn won the Republican primaries for his district. No Democrats filed, so he ran unopposed.

Citing troubles with the Illinois Department of Employment Security website, Skillicorn launched a recall effort to remove Illinois Governor J. B. Pritzker from office. Skillicorn said fellow Republican House members Brad Halbrook, Blaine Wilhour, and Darren Bailey agreed to sign the petition. All three had expressed dissatisfaction with the Governor's stay-at-home order. When asked about the effort, Pritzker blamed Skillicorn, his party, and former Republican Governor Bruce Rauner for a two-year budget impasse that left the Illinois Department of Employment Security without necessary funding.

The Illinois Legislative Inspector General substantiated allegations in an ethics complaint filed against Skillicorn and found Skillicorn recorded as having voted on bills during a June 1, 2020, legislative session, despite not being present. Skillicorn said he agreed with everything in the Inspector General's report and the votes he cast were inadvertent.

In the 2020 general election, Skillicorn lost his re-election bid to Democratic challenger Suzanne Ness. On January 5, 2021, eight days before the end of his term, Skillicorn resigned from the Illinois House of Representatives. Gary Daugherty, the Secretary of the Kane County Republican Party, was appointed to fill Skillicorn's vacancy during the lame duck session. Ness was sworn in for the 102nd General Assembly on January 13, 2021.

Other political activity
Skillicorn endorsed Libertarian Party candidate Kash Jackson in the 2018 Illinois gubernatorial election.

Skillicorn considered a 2020 bid for the 14th congressional district of Illinois. In a letter to Republican leadership regarding a pizza party, Skillicorn wrote, "I am serious about helping President Trump drain the swamp and empower the American people...If I am fortunate enough to serve as your congressman, I will be a tireless party builder to peel back the corrupt, corrosive influence of Nancy Pelosi and the new batch of Democratic socialists that threaten our jobs, communities, families and freedom while benefiting special interests." On September 4, 2019, Skillicorn instead endorsed Jim Oberweis for Congress in the 14th District and announced plans to seek re-election to the Illinois House.

Personal life 
Skillicorn resides with his wife, Heather, in East Dundee. He has lived in the Fox Valley area his entire life. In December 2020, Skillicorn and his wife moved to Fountain Hills, Arizona where he ran for town council.

References

External links
Representative Allen Skillicorn (R) 66th District at the Illinois General Assembly
101st, 100th

1970s births
Living people
Republican Party members of the Illinois House of Representatives
People from Algonquin, Illinois
21st-century American politicians